Jaz may refer to:

People 
 Jazmin Carlin (born 1990), Welsh swimmer
 Jaz Coleman (born 1960), English musician and record producer
 Jaz Lochrie, Scottish musician
 Jaz Rabadia MBE, Energy professional 
Jaz Rai, British Aerospace engineer and chairperson of the Sikh Recovery Network
 Jaz Shelley (born 2000), Australian basketball player
 Jaz Sinclair (born 1994), American actor
 Jaz (musician), American urban pop singer Jazmine Graham

Places 
 Jaz, Hormozgan, a village in Hormozgan Province, Iran
 Jezeh, Isfahan, a village in Hormozgan Province, Iran, also known as Jaz
 Gaz, Iran, a city in Isfahan Province, Iran, also known as Jaz
 Jaz (island), a Croatian island
 Jaz Beach, on the Montenegro Riviera

Other uses 
 Jaz (beer), Malaysia's only locally brewed beer
 JALways (JAZ), a Japanese airline
 ISO 639-3 code for the Jawe language of New Caledonia
 Jaz Hoyt, a fictional character in the American television series Oz
 Jaz Milvane, one of the principal characters on the BBC Radio 4 series Ed Reardon's Week

See also
 Jaz drive, a disk storage system
 Jaz-O (born 1964), American rapper
 Jazz